Puka Uru (Quechua puka red, uru tick; spider, "red tick" or "red spider", hispanicized names Pucaoro Grande or Pucuaro Grande) is a mountain in the Andes of Peru, about  high. It is located in the Pasco Region, Pasco Province, Ticlacayan District. Puka Uru lies northwest Qiwllaqucha, one of the highest peaks of the Waqurunchu mountain range.

References

Mountains of Peru
Mountains of Pasco Region